Javid Huseynov (born on 9 March 1988) is an Azerbaijani footballer who last played as an attacking midfielder for Gabala.

Career
Huseynov was born in Jabrayil, Soviet Union.

During the summer of 2012, Huseynov moved to TFF First League side Adana Demirspor, signing a two-year contract.

On 5 July 2014, Huseynov signed a one-year contract with Gabala.

Following Huseynov's release from jail, he re-signed with Gabala on 17 October 2016, until the end of the 2016–17 season.

On 1 June 2019, Huseynov left Gabala by mutual consent, signing a two-year contract with Zira FK the same day.

Huseynov was released by Gabala on 11 June 2021.

Murder of Rasim Aliyev 
In 2015, when Gabala won a qualifier to the Europa League against the Greek-Cypriot team Apollon Limassol, Huseynov raised the Turkish flag, which was a provocative gesture towards the Greek-Cypriotic fans and made an obscene gesture at a journalist who questioned the act.  An Azerbajaini journalist, Rasim Aliyev, reported on the incident and harshly criticized Huseynov as “ignorant and unable to behave himself”.  On 31 May 2016, the court found him guilty of being an accessory to the murder after the fact and not reporting a crime and sentenced to four years of imprisonment.

Career statistics

Club

International

International goals

Honours
Neftchi Baku
 Azerbaijan Premier League (2): 2010–11, 2011–12

Gabala
Azerbaijan Cup: 2018–19

References

External links
 
 Profile on Inter Baku's Official Site
 

1988 births
Living people
People from Jabrayil
Association football midfielders
Azerbaijani footballers
Azerbaijan international footballers
Azerbaijani expatriate footballers
Shamakhi FK players
Turan-Tovuz IK players
MOIK Baku players
FC Baku players
Gabala FC players
Adana Demirspor footballers
Expatriate footballers in Turkey
Azerbaijani expatriate sportspeople in Turkey
Azerbaijan Premier League players
TFF First League players
Neftçi PFK players